Hot Springs Airport  is a county-owned public-use airport in Sanders County, Montana, United States. It is located two nautical miles (4 km) east of the central business district of Hot Springs, Montana, a town on the Flathead Indian Reservation.

Facilities and aircraft 
Hot Springs Airport covers an area of 117 acres (47 ha) at an elevation of 2,763 feet (842 m) above mean sea level. It has one runway designated 6/24 with an asphalt measuring 3,550 by 45 feet (1,082 x 14 m). For the 12-month period ending July 22, 2008, the airport had 500 general aviation aircraft operations, an average of 41 per month.

References

External links 
 Aerial image as of 18 July 1995 from USGS The National Map

Airports in Montana
Buildings and structures in Sanders County, Montana
Transportation in Sanders County, Montana